Burnt Shirt Branch is a stream in the U.S. state of Missouri.

Some say the area was named "Burnt Shirt" because an old shirt was used to fuel a light, while others believe a railroad man's shirt was burned in an accident.

See also
List of rivers of Missouri

References

Rivers of Clark County, Missouri
Rivers of Scotland County, Missouri
Rivers of Missouri